Karungi  is a surname. Notable people with the surname include: 

Elizabeth Beikiriize Karungi (born 1976), Ugandan politician
Josephine Karungi, Ugandan journalist and television personality
Naomi Karungi (1978–2020), Ugandan helicopter pilot 
Sheebah Karungi (born 1989), Ugandan musician, dancer and actress